Merizocera brincki, is a species of spider of the family Psilodercidae. It is endemic to Sri Lanka.

See also
 List of Ochyroceratidae species

References

Psilodercidae
Spiders of Asia
Arthropods of Sri Lanka
Endemic fauna of Sri Lanka
Spiders described in 1975